The Masonic Hall in Parker, South Dakota is a historic building dating from 1925. It was originally constructed as a residence by one of a local banker.  After a fire in 1931, the building was purchased by the Parker Masonic lodge and converted into a lodge meeting hall.  It was listed on the National Register of Historic Places in 2004.

References

Renaissance Revival architecture in South Dakota
Houses completed in 1925
Buildings and structures in Turner County, South Dakota
Masonic buildings in South Dakota
Clubhouses on the National Register of Historic Places in South Dakota
National Register of Historic Places in Turner County, South Dakota